Mattress Firm Inc. is an American mattress store chain founded on July 4, 1986. The headquarters of the company is located in Houston, Texas.

Business
Before its bankruptcy in 2018, the company operated over 3,600 locations in 48 U.S. states. Mattress Firm has been owned by Steinhoff Holdings since 2016.

On October 5, 2018, Mattress Firm filed for Chapter 11 bankruptcy. The company planned to break 700 lease contracts by closing 200 unprofitable stores as soon as possible and was considering closing the other 500 stores out of the more than 3,300 it operated at that time. In November 2018, Mattress Firm emerged from Chapter 11 bankruptcy.

In 2019, Mattress Firm appointed John Eck as CEO.

In March 2020, Mattress Firm was one of several retailers to announce they would not pay some or all of their rent in April.

Acquisitions

Mattress Pro 
In 2007, Mattress Firm acquired the mattress retailer Mattress Pro, which operated locations in the Southern United States (Texas & Nevada).

Sleep Train
The retail bedding manufacturer The Sleep Train Inc operated primarily in California. It was founded by Dale Carlsen in June 1985. The company is based in Rocklin, California.

In June 2000, Sleep Train sold 24 of its stores (mainly in Seattle and Portland), or about 30 percent of its business, to Fenway Partners, a New York private-investment firm which had acquired Sleep Country USA, a competing chain established in 1991, three months earlier. At the time, Sleep Train had 44 stores (of which 18 were in Washington) and Sleep Country USA 28.
In 2002, Sleep Train Inc. announced plans to purchase 54 of Mattress Discounters' stores in California during that company's bankruptcy—which would more than double Sleep Train's size.

In 2003, Fenway Partners sold Sleep Country USA to the Atlanta-based Simmons Company, and in August 2006, Sleep Train Inc. purchased the then-55-store mattress chain from Simmons.

In September 2011, Sleep Train acquired Christian's Mattress Xpress, converting three stores into new Sleep Train stores in Visalia, Fresno and Fowler, California. The following month, October 2011, Sleep Train purchased Mattress Outlet, a 14-store company with 13 stores in eastern Washington and one in Idaho, and America's Mattress, a seven-store company in western Washington. In October 2012, Sleep Train acquired Sleep City, an 8-store chain in Eastern Washington and Idaho. In April 2014, Sleep Train acquired America's Mattress in Hawaii. The acquisition included nine local America's Mattress stores: five stores on Oahu, two stores on the Big Island in Kona and Hilo, and one each on the islands of Maui and Kauai.

On September 4, 2014, Mattress Firm Inc. announced it would buy The Sleep Train Inc. for $425 million. In February and March 2017, the Sleep Train stores were renamed as Mattress Firm outlets.

Sleep Country USA
Sleep Country USA was a Pacific Northwest bedding retailer founded in 1991. It had more than 80 mattress stores in Oregon, Washington and Idaho. The company headquarters were in Kent, Washington.

Sunny Kobe Cook and Robert Cook founded Sleep Country USA in 1991 as a specialty sleep store chain. It started with 8 stores and approximately 25 employees in Washington. In March 2000, New York-based Fenway Partners Inc. acquired Sleep Country from Robert Cook and Sunny Kobe Cook. In 2003, Fenway Partners sold Sleep Country USA to the Atlanta-based Simmons Company. In August 2006, The Sleep Train, Inc. purchased the then-55-store Sleep Country USA Pacific Northwest chain from Simmons for $55m. The chain continued to operate as Sleep Country USA. Sleep Country Canada, an unaffiliated company, uses the same jingle.

In July 2015, the Kent, Washington-based Sleep Country USA company announced that it would begin rebranding all of its stores with the Sleep Train name, the California-based company that is now owned by Mattress Firm. Work to change the signage at stores was expected to continue into the fall of 2015, at least.

Mattress Barn
Mattress Barn was a chain of mattress stores located only in Florida. On August 29, 2014, it was announced that Mattress Firm would acquire all of the remaining Mattress Barn locations. In September 2016, all of the remaining stores converted into Mattress Firm.

Sleepy's 

In 2015, Mattress Firm announced its plans to buy out its competitor Sleepy's for $780 million. With this purchase, Mattress Firm would come to have over 3,500 stores. Mattress Firm continues to use the Sleepy's name for their own brand of mattresses.

Sleep America 
Sleep America was an Arizona bedding retailer founded in 1997 by Debbie and Leonard Gaby. By the time of Mattress Firm's acquisition of the company, they had about 30 stores. They were based in Phoenix, Arizona.

On January 6, 2015, Mattress Firm acquired Sleep America for $12.5 million. Over the next 4 months, all of the Sleep America stores closed and were converted into Mattress Firm stores. A few locations became clearance centers for Mattress Firm.

References

External links

 

Companies based in Houston
Companies formerly listed on the Nasdaq
Mattress retailers of the United States
American companies established in 1986
Retail companies established in 1986
American subsidiaries of foreign companies
2016 mergers and acquisitions
Companies that filed for Chapter 11 bankruptcy in 2018